John Vernard Johnson (born May 8, 1968) is a former American football linebacker who played five seasons in the National Football League with the San Francisco 49ers, Cincinnati Bengals and New Orleans Saints. He was drafted by the San Francisco 49ers in the second round of the 1991 NFL Draft. He played college football at Clemson University and attended LaGrange High School in LaGrange, Georgia.

External links
Just Sports Stats
Fanbase profile

Living people
1968 births
Players of American football from Georgia (U.S. state)
American football linebackers
African-American players of American football
Clemson Tigers football players
San Francisco 49ers players
Cincinnati Bengals players
New Orleans Saints players
People from LaGrange, Georgia
21st-century African-American people
20th-century African-American sportspeople